is a former Japanese football player.

Playing career
Nishimura was born in Takatsuki on April 15, 1983. He joined J1 League club Sanfrecce Hiroshima from Gamba Osaka youth team in 2002. On May 6, he debuted as substitute midfielder against Urawa Reds in J.League Cup. In September, he was loaned to Japan Football League (JFL) club SC Tottori (later Gainare Tottori) and played many matches. In 2003, he returned to Sanfrecce. However he could hardly play in the match. In 2005, he moved to Gainare for the first time in 2 years. He played as regular player in 3 seasons. In 2008, he moved to Regional Leagues club Banditonce Kakogawa. In 2009, he moved to Prefectural Leagues club Volador Matsue. He retired end of 2009 season.

Club statistics

References

External links

1983 births
Living people
Association football people from Osaka Prefecture
People from Takatsuki, Osaka
Japanese footballers
J1 League players
J2 League players
Japan Football League players
Sanfrecce Hiroshima players
Gainare Tottori players
Matsue City FC players
Association football midfielders